GQL may refer to:

 Google Query Language, SQL-like language for retrieving entities and keys in Google Cloud Datastore.
 Graph Query Language, a proposed international standard property graph query language.
 GraphQL, open-source data query and manipulation language for APIs, and a runtime for fulfilling queries with existing data.

See also 
 Query language